In biblical cosmology, the firmament is the vast solid dome created by God during the Genesis creation narrative to divide the primal sea into upper and lower portions so that the dry land could appear. The concept was adopted into the subsequent Classical/Medieval model of heavenly spheres, but was dropped with advances in astronomy in the 16th and 17th centuries. Today it survives as a synonym for "sky" or "heaven".

Etymology
In English, the word "firmament" is recorded as early as 1250, in the Middle English Story of Genesis and Exodus.
It later appeared in the King James Bible. The same word is found in French and German Bible translations, all from Latin firmamentum (a firm object), used in the Vulgate (4th century). This in turn is a calque of the Greek , also meaning a solid or firm structure (Greek  = rigid), which appears in the Septuagint, the Greek translation made by Jewish scholars around 200 BCE.

These words all translate the Biblical Hebrew word rāqīaʿ, used for example in Genesis 1.6, where it is contrasted with shamayim, translated as "heaven(s)" in Genesis 1.1. Rāqīaʿ derives from the root rqʿ, meaning "to beat or spread out thinly". Gerhard von Rad explains:
{{Blockquote|text=Rāqīaʿ means that which is firmly hammered, stamped (a word of the same root in Phoenecian means "tin dish"!). The meaning of the verb rqʿ concerns the hammering of the vault of heaven into firmness (Isa. 42.5; Ps.136.6). The Vulgate translates rāqīaʿ with firmamentum, and that remains the best rendering.|source=Gerhard von Rad }}

Models of the Firmament

The plurality of heaven

Perhaps beginning with Origen, the different identifiers used for heavens in the Book of Genesis, caelum and firmamentum, sparked some commentary on the significance of the order of creation (caelum identified as the heaven of the first day, and firmamentum as the heaven of the second day). Some of these theories identified caelum as the higher, immaterial and spiritual heaven, whereas firmamentum was of corporeal existence. 

Christian theologians of note writing between the 5th and mid-12th century were generally in agreement that the waters, sometimes called the "crystalline orb", were located above the firmament and beneath the fiery heaven that was also called empyrean (from Greek ἔμπυρος). One medieval writer who rejected such notions was Pietro d'Abano who argued that theologians "assuming a crystalline, or aqueous sphere, and an empyrean, or firey sphere" were relying on revelation more than Scripture.

About this Ambrose wrote: "Wise men of the world say that water cannot be over the heavens"; the firmament is called such, according to Ambrose, because it held back the waters above it.

This matter of the position of the "waters" above the firmament was considered by Augustine in De Genesi ad litteram (perhaps his least studied work): "only God knows how and why [the waters] are there, but we cannot deny the authority of Holy Scripture which is greater than our understanding".

Corporeality

Early Christian writers wrote at length about the material nature of the firmament, the problem arising from the barrier said to be created when it divided the waters above and below it. At issue was the reconciliation of Scripture with Aristotle's cosmology.

Saint Basil rejected the notion that the firmament is made of solid ice, although Bede in Hexaemeron ignores the problem of the motion of celestial bodies (stars) in a solid firmament and declares that the siderum caelum (heaven of the celestial bodies) was made firm (firmatum) in the midst of the waters so should be interpreted as having the firmness of crystalline stone (cristallini Iapidis'').

History

The ancient Hebrews, like all the ancient peoples of the Near East, believed the sky was a solid dome with the Sun, Moon, planets and stars embedded in it. Around the 4th to 3rd centuries BCE the Greeks, under the influence of Aristotle who argued that the heavens must be perfect and that a sphere was the perfect geometrical figure,  exchanged this for a spherical Earth surrounded by solid spheres. This became the dominant model in the Classical and Medieval world-view, and even when Copernicus placed the Sun at the centre of the system he included an outer sphere that held the stars (and by having the earth rotate daily on its axis it allowed the firmament to be completely stationary). Tycho Brahe's studies of the nova of 1572 and the Comet of 1577 were the first major challenges to the idea that orbs existed as solid, incorruptible, material objects, and in 1584 Giordano Bruno proposed a cosmology without a firmament: an infinite universe in which the stars are actually suns with their own planetary systems. After Galileo began using a telescope to examine the sky it became harder to argue that the heavens were perfect, as Aristotelian philosophy required, and by 1630 the concept of solid orbs was no longer dominant.

See also

Citations

Bibliography

External links

 The Vault of Heaven.

Ancient astronomy
Obsolete scientific theories
Religious cosmologies
Christian cosmology
Vulgate Latin words and phrases
Biblical cosmology